Abdullah Khodabandeh (28 August 1936 – 18 December 2019) was an Iranian wrestler. He competed in the men's freestyle bantamweight at the 1964 Summer Olympics.

References

External links
 
 

1936 births
2019 deaths
Iranian male sport wrestlers
Olympic wrestlers of Iran
Wrestlers at the 1964 Summer Olympics
Place of birth missing